Turks in Belgium, also referred to as Turkish Belgians or Belgian Turks, are people of full or partial Turkish ethnicity living in Belgium. The majority of Belgian Turks descend from the Republic of Turkey; however, there has also been significant Turkish migration from other post-Ottoman countries including ethnic Turkish communities which have come to Belgium from the Balkans (especially from Bulgaria, Greece, Kosovo, North Macedonia and Romania), the island of Cyprus, and more recently Iraq and Syria.

History

Turkish migration from the Republic of Turkey

Turkish migration from the Republic of Turkey to Belgium began in the 1960s when Belgium was actively encouraging immigration to meet its employment needs in an era of rapid economic expansion. These immigrants were welcomed as "guest workers" when Belgium and Turkey signed a bilateral agreement in July 1964. As mainly unskilled labourers, Turkish immigrants hoped to make a fortune in a short time and then return to their homeland. The majority of Turkish migrants arrived from central Anatolian provinces of Afyon (particularly from Emirdağ), Eskisehir, Kayseri, Konya (particularly from Piribeyli) and Sivas. Many settled in the industrialised areas of Belgium; thereafter, these migrants brought their families over when Belgium attempted to resolve the growing problem of low population by encouraging family reunification.

By the 1970s the phenomenon of immigrants arriving in Belgium with a tourist visa started; most came from Afyon, especially from the town of Emirdağ. Upon arrival they looked for work and tried to legalise their status as labourers. The presence of these tourists created a black market labour force so that on two occasions the government had to legalise their status. Once they obtained the status of "guest workers" they could bring in their family.

By the 1980s, immigration to Belgium for economic reasons was forbidden by law. The only legal way to take up residence in Belgium was by family reunification, which was only applicable to members of the nuclear family of guest workers or by marrying someone who was a Belgian citizen. Another possible motive for coming to Belgium was to apply for the status of asylum-seeker upon arrival. Turkish asylum seekers came from all over Turkey, with some belonging to minority groups.

Mainland Turks have continued to migrate to Belgium in the twenty-first century in the hope of building a better future; many lured by social and economic security.

Turkish migration from the Balkans

Bulgaria
Initially, Turkish Bulgarians first arrived in Belgium as refugees in the 1980s due to the Bulgarisation policies of the so-called "Revival Process" under the communist ruler Todor Zivkov which sought to forcefully assimilate the Turkish minority. The next wave of Turkish Bulgarian migrants in the 1990s and early 2000s were mostly undocumented migrants. These early Turkish Bulgarian arrivals found work in areas where there was an established mainland Turkish community, especially in Ghent, but also in Melle, Zele and Hamme. 

More recently, after Bulgaria became a member of the European Union during the 2007 enlargement, the number of Turkish Bulgarian migrants to Belgium increased significantly due to their freedom of movement rights as EU citizens. Thus, Turkish Bulgarian emigration to Belgium in the twenty-first century has been dictated by the economic situation and the stagnation of the labour market in Bulgaria. 

As a result of the continuous Turkish Bulgarian migration, the majority of Bulgarian citizens living in Belgium are ethnically Turkish; moreover, Turkish Bulgarian children who were either born in Belgium, or who arrived at preschool age, hardly understand the Bulgarian language. Most Turkish Bulgarians tend to live in areas where there is a large mainland Turkish population, such as Genk.  Thus, "Genk Bulgarians" are mostly of Turkish origin; in 2013, estimates on the population in Genk alone ranged between 10,000 and 20,000.

Greece
There have been two main waves of migration from the Turkish minority of Western Thrace (located in Greece) to Western Europe, including to Belgium. The first wave of Turkish Western Thracian migration started in the 1960s and intensified further between 1970-2010 due to political and economic reasons.

Although many Western Thrace Turks living in Western Europe intended to return to Greece after working for a number of years, the Greek government used Article 19 of the 1955 Greek Constitution to strip members of the Turkish minority living abroad of their Greek citizenship. According to Article 19 of the Greek Constitution: 

A report published by the Human Rights Watch in 1990 confirmed that:

Thus, many Western Thrace Turks were forced to remain in the countries they had settled in, which, in turn, also established the permanent Turkish Western Thracian community in Belgium.

More recently, the second mass migration wave of ethnic Turks from Greece has been significantly larger in numbers, although it occurred only within eight years, between 2010-18, due to the Greek government-debt crisis.

Kosovo
Migration from the Turkish Kosovar community to Belgium began when many were forced to flee the Kosovo War (1998-99). Alongside the Turkish Macedonians in Belgium, they are active in the Belçika Rumeli Türkleri Derneği ("Belgian Rumelian Turkish Association").

North Macedonia
The Turkish Macedonian minority have joined other Macedonian citizens in migrating to Belgium. Together with the Turkish Kosovars in Belgium, the Turkish Macedonians are active in the Belçika Rumeli Türkleri Derneği ("Belgian Rumelian Turkish Association").

Romania
Since the first decade of the twenty-first century, there has been a significant decrease in the population of the Turkish Romanian minority group due to the admission of Romania into the European Union in 2007 and the subsequent relaxation of the travelling and migration regulations. Hence, Turkish Romanians, especially from the Dobruja region, have joined other Romanian citizens in migrating mostly to Western European countries, including Belgium.

Turkish migration from the Levant

Cyprus
Most Turkish Cypriot migrants left the island of Cyprus due to economic and political reasons in the 20th century, especially after the Cyprus crisis of 1963–64 and then the 1974 Cypriot coup d'état carried out by the Greek military junta which was followed by the reactionary Turkish invasion of the island. More recently, with the 2004 enlargement of the European Union, Turkish Cypriots have had the right to live and work across the European Union, including in Belgium, as EU citizens. In 2012, hundreds of Turkish Cypriots gathered in Brussels to draw attention to the EU's failure to keep the promises made to Northern Cyprus after having voted in favour of reunification during the 2004 Annan Plan referendum. The TRNC provides assistance to its Turkish Cypriot residents living in Belgium via the TRNC Brussels Representative Office located in Avenue Louise; in addition, the office promotes friendly relations between the TRNC and Belgium, as well as economic and cultural relations.

Iraq
Turkish Iraqis have settled in Belgium due to various conflicts in Iraq, including the Iran–Iraq War (1980-88), the Gulf War (1991), and the Iraq War (2003-11). The majority of Iraqi Turks have arrived in Belgium during the European migrant crisis (2014-19) alongside other Iraqi refugees.

Syria
Due to the Syrian civil war, many Syrian Turks have sought refuge in Turkey and Western Europe. In particular, it was during the European migrant crisis (2014-19) that Syrian citizens came to Belgium in larger numbers.

Turkish migration from the modern diaspora

In addition to ethnic Turkish people that have migrated to Belgium from post-Ottoman modern nation-states, there has also been an increasing migration wave from the modern Turkish diaspora. For example, members of the Turkish Dutch community have also arrived in Belgium as Dutch citizens. According to a study by Petra Wieke de Jong, focusing on second-generation Turkish-Dutch people specifically born between the years 1983 and 1992 only, 1,208 people from this age group and generation reported Belgium as their country of emigration in 2001 to 2017. A further 1,761 people in this group did not report their emigration destination.

Demographics 

Around half of Turkish Belgians live in the Flemish region, one-quarter in Wallonia, and one-quarter in Brussels. Turks from the same region in Turkey tend to congregate not only in the same cities but also in the same quarters. The majority of Turks live in the Schaerbeek commune. The Chaussee De Haecht street is heavily populated with Turkish immigrants, with its pizzerias, pastry shops, cafes, and barbers, is reminiscent of a Turkish street.

Population
Official Belgian data only collects statistics on foreign citizens rather than the ethnic affiliation of Belgian citizens. Consequently, the Turkish Belgian community cannot self-declare their ethnicity in censuses. 

The majority of Turkish Belgians are mainland Turks and their Belgian-born descendants, however, there are growing Turkish communities from the Balkans  (e.g. Balkan Turks, Bulgarian Turks, Macedonian Turks, Romanian Turks, Western Thrace Turks etc.) and the Levant (e.g. Cypriot Turks, Iraqi Turks and Syrian Turks) who are registered according to their citizenship (i.e. "Belgian", "Bulgarian", "Cypriot", "Greek", "Iraqi", "Syrian" etc.) rather than their Turkish ethnicity. 

In 2012 Professor Raymond Taras said that the population of Turkish Belgians totalled over 200,000. In 2021 Thierry Debels pointed out that various sources stated that there was already 500,000 Turks in Belgium since the early 1990s, including Turkish-Belgian descendants.

Religion 

The majority of Turks are Sunni Muslims Several Turkish Sunni groupings are active in Belgium, most notably Milli Görüş (Fédération islamique belge), the Süleymancis (Union des Centres culturels islamiques de Belgique) and the Nurcus . As in other countries, there is also an official Sunni Diyanet (Fondation religieuse islamique turque de Belgique), which controls most mosques and a majority of the affiliations to the repatriation funerary insurance.

Another Turkish Muslim community present in Belgium is the Alevi one, with several associations in Brussels, the Centre culturel turc pour le respect de la personne humaine - Erenler (Turkish cultural centre for the respect of the human being - Erenler), officially registered in 1994, founded by Alevis from the village of Karacalar, near Emirdag, led by their traditional spirituel leader (dede) from the Şahbaz family, and the more progressive Centre socioculturel alévi de Bruxelles, officially registered in 2003 by 14 founding members, 4 of whom were born in Elbistan, 3 in Belgium, 2 in Gücük (near Elbistan), the rest in Adıyaman, Inis, Tunceli, Soğucak and ), Charleroi (Centre culturel alévi de Charleroi, officially registered in 1999 by 9 founding members, 6 of whom had the dual Turkish-Belgian citizenship), Antwerp (Alevietische Kultureel Centrum Antwerpen), Liège (from 2002 till 2004 Liège Alevi Kültür Derneği - Association culturelle Alévi de Liège, since 2005 Foyer culturel alévi de Liège) and the Limburg province (Samenwerking Limburgse Alevieten, officially registered in 1990). There is also a Federation of the Belgian Alevi Associations, Belçika Alevi Birlikleri Federasyonu, since 2008 Fédération unions des Alévis en Belgique - Belçika Alevi Birlikleri Federasyonu (FUAB-BABF), created in 2003, based in Antwerp, then in Brussels in 2006, and grouping the Alevietische Kultureel Centrum Antwerpen, the Centre culturel alévi de Charleroi and the Samenwerking Limburgse Alevieten.

Organisations and associations 
There are dozens of Turkish associations in Belgium, most are grouped into federations, either linked to the Turkish government (Diyanet) and embassy or to various Turkish religious and political movements, Milli Görüş (Fédération islamique belge), the Nurcus, the  Süleymancis (Union des Centres islamiques de Belgique), the Grey Wolves (Belçika Ülkücü Türk Dernekleri Federasyon/Belçika Türk Federasyonu) etc. Apart from these, there are also civil society associations of fellow countryman such as BTDB (Federation of Turkish Associations in Belgium), Belgium Piribeyli Culture & Solidarity Association, Emirdag People Solidarity Association (EYAD), BETİAD (Belgian Turkish Businessmen Association) and charity organizations.

Political participation 
At the federal level, several deputies and senators have been elected or coopted to the Belgian Chamber of Representatives and Senate.

There are also Turkish-Belgian members of the regional parliaments, one of them, Emir Kir (French-speaking Socialist Party), became an underminister in the Brussels regional government in 2004, and again in 2009, as Secretary for Public Sanitation and Monument Conservation.

Music 
Turks have also contributed to music in Belgium, recently Hadise daughter of a family from Sivas was in the pop music world in Belgium. Hadise made a name for herself in 2003 in the “Idool” song contest sponsored by VTM, the largest Belgian broadcaster. Her songs “Stir Me Up” and her album “Milk Chocolate Girl” were on top of the charts for a long time.

Notable people

See also 
List of Turkish Belgians
Islam in Belgium
Belgium–Turkey relations
Faymonville
Turks in Europe
Turks in France
Turks in Germany
Turks in the Netherlands

References

Bibliography 
 

.
.

.

.
.
.
.
.
.
.

Further reading

External links 

 Info-Türk (Turkish Progressive news agency based in Brussels)

Belgium
Belgium
Middle Eastern diaspora in Belgium
Ethnic groups in Belgium